The Nordic Summer University (NSU) is a Nordic research network funded through the Nordic Council of Ministers, organizing study circles in the social and human sciences, mainly for PhD students or post-doctoral scholars from the Nordic countries. The activity is organized in a maximum of ten study circles. Separate winter seminars are held for each study circle, and a more extensive summer conference is organised for all the study circles, in a different location within the Nordic countries each year.

The interdisciplinary groups in the circles meet twice a year in order to discuss a wide range of topics, primarily within the humanistic and the social sciences. During the main summer event, all circles join for a week of academic discussion. The activities are sponsored by the Nordic Council, with financial oversight performed by Foreningerne NORDENs Forbund (FNF). One of the NSU sponsorship items is funding to 140-150 scholars each year in order to offset the costs associated with their participation in the joint sessions.

The study circles have been conducted for more than 60 years and have in the past involved debates between several leading intellectuals, politicians, and scholars of the Nordic countries, including Niels Bohr, Johan Fjord Jensen, Mauno Koivisto, Johan Galtung, Jostein Gripsrud, and Horace Engdahl. The focus of the research network is interdisciplinary and multicultural. In its statutes, NSU states that it is committed to introducing foreign ideas and influences that not yet have a foothold in the region's universities.

NSU has a publishing house, NSU Press, with distribution secured through Århus University Press.

References

External links
 The Nordic Summer University's website
 Århus University Press 
 FNF Foreningerne NORDENs Forbund
 Reference to history of NSU (Swedish)

Nordic organizations
Educational projects